Growing Up is a 1982 memoir by author and journalist Russell Baker. An autobiography chronicling Baker's youth in Virginia and his mother's strength of character during the Great Depression, it won the Pulitzer Prize for Biography or Autobiography in 1983.

References
 Andrea Chambers, Those Funnybones Grew from a Depression-Era Virginia Boyhood, People, December 20, 1982
 New York State Writers Institute
 Richard Lingeman, Suspiciously like Real Life, The New York Times, October 17, 1982

1982 non-fiction books
American memoirs
Pulitzer Prize for Biography or Autobiography-winning works